Bich Ngan's bent-toed gecko (Cyrtodactylus bichnganae) is a species of lizard in the family Gekkonidae. The species is endemic to Vietnam.

Etymology
The specific name, bichnganae, is in honor of Ngo Hoang Bich Ngan, who is the daughter of senior binomial authority Ngo Van Tri.

Geographic range
C. bichnganae is found in northwestern Vietnam, in Sơn La Province.

Habitat

Description

References

Further reading
Ngo VT, Grismer LL (2010). "A new karst-dwelling Cyrtodactylus (Squamata: Gekkonidae) from Sơn La Province, north-western Vietnam". Hamadryad 35 (1): 84–95. (Cyrtodactylus bichnganae, new species).

Cyrtodactylus
Reptiles described in 2010